Trechus quarelicus is a species of ground beetle in the subfamily Trechinae. It was described by Belousov in 1987.

References

quarelicus
Beetles described in 1987